Miloš Živković may refer to:

 Miloš Živković (footballer, born May 1984), Serbian football midfielder
 Miloš Živković (footballer, born December 1984), Serbian football defender
 Miloš Živković (footballer, born 1985), Serbian football defender
 Milos Zivkovic (Canadian football) (born 1986), Canadian player of Canadian football
 Miloš Živković (writer) (born 1974), Serbian author